Gutman is a surname. Notable people with the surname include:

 Alberto Gutman (born 1959), American politician
 Albin Gutman (born 1947), Slovene general
 Alexander Gutman (born 1945), Russian film director
 Amy Gutman (born 1960), American novelist
 Anthony Gutman, British banker
 Dan Gutman (born 1955), American author
 Daniel Gutman (1901-1993), American lawyer, state senator, state assemblyman, president justice of the municipal court, and law school dean.
 Gloria M Gutman (born 1939), Canadian gerontologist
 Herbert Gutman (1928–1985), American labor historian and scholar of slavery
 Howard W. Gutman (born 1956), American ambassador
 Huck Gutman (born c.1944), American academic and political adviser
 Hugo Gutmann (1880–1962) German-Jewish veteran of first World War, famously known as Adolf Hitler's superior officer.
 Israel Gutman (1923–2013), Israeli historian
 Iván Gutman (born 1947), Serbian chemist and mathematician
 Jacob C. Gutman (1890–1982), American businessman and philanthropist
 Jorge Castañeda Gutman (born 1953), Mexican politician and author
 Laura Gutman (born 1958), Argentinean therapist
 Lev Gutman (born 1945), Latvian–Israeli–German chess grandmaster
 Matt Gutman (born 1977), American journalist
 Nachum Gutman (1898–1980), Israeli painter, sculptor, and author 
 Natalia Gutman (born 1942), Russian cellist
 René Gutman (born  1950), French Orthodox rabbi
 Rinat Gutman (born 1980), Israeli musician
 Roy Gutman (born 1944), American journalist and author
 Shaul Gutman (born 1945), Israeli academic and politician

Fictional characters
 Casper Gutman, villain in the novel The Maltese Falcon and various film adaptations

See also 
 Gutmans (disambiguation)
 Gutmann (disambiguation)
 Guttman
 Guttmann
 Goodman (disambiguation)

Jewish surnames